"Weekend" is a song by Dutch band Earth and Fire. It was released by Earth and Fire as a single in November 1979 and reached the number one spot in the singles charts in the Netherlands, Switzerland, Germany, Denmark and Portugal.  It was written by keyboard player Gerard Koerts for the album Reality Fills Fantasy.

Track listing

Chart performance

Weekly charts

Year-end charts

Sales and certifications

Chips version 

Weekend was first covered by the Swedish group Chips on their eponymously titled debut-album. Originally, the version was recorded in 1980, but was only available on the album's first printed issues, as all subsequent releases (now called "Sweets'n Chips") replaced the song with the track "Good Morning". It wasn't until the release of the 1997 Greatest Hits-album "20 bästa låtar" that the song became widely available again. The B-Side on the single was the Instrumental track "Tokyo".

Track listing

Scooter version

"Weekend" was also covered by German techno group Scooter as "Weekend!". It was released on 24 February 2003 as the first single from their ninth studio album, The Stadium Techno Experience (2003). The single reached number two in Germany and was a top-10 hit in Austria, Denmark, Finland, the Netherlands, Norway, and Sweden. In Norway, the song is certified Platinum for sales exceeding 10,000.

Music video
The video for the song takes place on an illuminated part of a loam-covered floor encircled by dark. While Scooter are performing the song, there are Buddhist and Christian monks, nuns, Asian martial artists, topless women, traditional Indian female dancers and Ganesha dancing around them. H. P. Baxxter can also be seen wearing a costume resembling those worn by the Roman centurions. The video was censored in the multimedia part of the CD single released in Germany.

Track listing

Charts

Weekly charts

Year-end charts

Certifications

Release history

Other versions 
In 1980 the Belgian band De Strangers released a Dutch-language version of the song under the title "Pluchke".

The song was released in German version as "Kein Mädchen für das Wochenende" which was first sung by Conny Morin and later was covered by Daniela Dilow.

In 2002 Kid Q released the single "This Feeling", which contains a sample of "Weekend".

In 2008 Bloodhound Gang released a cover version of the Scooter cover for "Weekend!"

In 2012, Belgian electro producer Mickey released a cover version of the original track featuring Sylvie 'Billie' Kreusch.

In 2017, Dutch artist De Ambassade released a New wave/Synth-pop rendition of the song under the title "Jerney", after the lead singer of Earth and Fire Jerney Kaagman.

In 2019, German DSDS Star Sarah Lombardi released Weekend, a collaboration with DJ Herzbeat, as Schlager Song. The Song started on place 93 of the GfK Entertainment Charts and reached in the ITunes charts the Number 1, after only one week.

In 2020, German DJ LIZOT released a cover version of Weekend.

References

1979 singles
1979 songs
1997 singles
2003 singles
Dutch Top 40 number-one singles
Number-one singles in Belgium
Number-one singles in Denmark
Number-one singles in Germany
Number-one singles in Hungary
Number-one singles in Portugal
Number-one singles in Switzerland
Scooter (band) songs
UK Independent Singles Chart number-one singles
Vertigo Records singles